Cullmann is a German surname. Notable people with the surname include:

 Bernd Cullmann (born 1939), West German athlete, winner of gold medal in 4×100 m relay at the 1960 Summer Olympics
 Bernhard Cullmann (born 1949), nicknamed "Bernd", German footballer
 Carl Culmann (1821–1881), German structural engineer
 Edgar M. Cullman (1918–2011), American businessman
 Howard S. Cullman (1891–1972), American civil servant and philanthropist
 John G. Cullmann (1823–1895), Bavarian-born political activist and founder of Cullman, Alabama
 Joseph Cullman III (1912–2004), American businessman
 Oscar Cullmann (1902–1999), Christian theologian in the Lutheran tradition

See also

 Cullman (disambiguation)
 Kehlmann, a surname
 Kuhlman, a surname
 Kuhlmann (disambiguation)
 Kullmann, a surname

German-language surnames